Giovanni Rasori (1766–1837) was an Italian academic, physician and translator.

Career

Rasori was born in Parma. He began studying at the university of that city with results so brilliant that he deserved the interest of Ferdinand, Duke of Parma that allowed him to complete his studies at the University of Florence, Pavia, London and Paris, where he remained fascinated by the illuminist and pre-revolutionary climate of the time. In Parma, he was a pupil of the anatomist Flaminio Torrigiani.

Rasori graduated in medicine and philosophy, he immediately gained fame by devoting himself to translating the works of the Scottish physician John Brown. His career was lightning fast: soon he became rector of the prestigious Collegio Ghislieri, to be later appointed professor of medical pathology at the University of Pavia in 1795, as well as rector of the same university in 1797.

Rasori published an Italian translation of Erasmus Darwin's Zoonomia (Milan, 1803-1805). The translation remained in print but was banned in 1817 under Pope Pius VII. A later edition was published in Naples, 1820. Rasori was supportive of ideas of spontaneous generation and transmutation of species.

Strongly opposed to the Austrian domination, he voluntarily enlisted in the Cisalpine army and, after the battle of Marengo, he moved to Milan where he became physician of the Cisalpine Republic and later of the Italian Republic. In this capacity he was sent to Genoa to decide and coordinate the sanitary operations necessary to eradicate the epidemic of intestinal fever that had hit the city, following the prolonged and joint siege by the Austrian troops and the British navy.

From 1806 he taught medical clinic at the Policlinico of Milan. On November 26, 1814 , Rasori was arrested while participating in a meeting of anti-Austrian conspirators, better known as the " Brescian-Milanese military conspiracy".  Sentenced to prison, he was freed in 1818 , but he did not regain any teaching duties.

Rasori dedicated his last twenty years to the study and practice of the medical profession in the city of Milan, where he died in 1837.

References

1766 births
1837 deaths
18th-century Italian people
19th-century Italian physicians
Heads of universities in Italy
Italian translators
Physicians from Parma
Proto-evolutionary biologists
Translators from English
Translators to Italian
Academic staff of the University of Pavia
19th-century translators